Wilhelm Ramm (1921–1982) was a Norwegian chess player.

Biography
In the mid-1950s, Wilhelm Ramm was one of the leading Norwegian chess players. He played mainly in domestic chess tournaments and Norwegian Chess Championships.

Wilhelm Ramm played for Norway in the Chess Olympiads:
 In 1952, at first reserve board in the 10th Chess Olympiad in Helsinki (+0, =0, −3),
 In 1954, at second reserve board in the 11th Chess Olympiad in Amsterdam (+2, =4, −5).

References

External links

Wilhelm Ramm chess games at 365chess.com

1921 births
1982 deaths
Norwegian chess players
Chess Olympiad competitors
20th-century chess players